Manhattan Beach Boulevard is a major east–west thoroughfare in western Los Angeles County. It begins at a T-intersection with Van Ness Avenue in Gardena and terminates at the Manhattan Beach pier, feet from the Pacific Ocean. It passes under Interstate 405, but cars cannot enter or exit the freeway at that point (the closest onramp is a block north on Inglewood Boulevard). 

The boulevard is one of the five principal roadways in Manhattan Beach (the other four being Rosecrans Avenue, Sepulveda Boulevard, Artesia Boulevard, and Aviation Boulevard), and the intersection between it and Sepulveda is one of the busiest in the city. As implied by its name, Manhattan Beach Boulevard consists of at least six lanes for its entire length, with the exception of between Pacific Avenue and The Strand, where it is reduced to two lanes.

Manhattan Beach Boulevard provided service with Metro Local line 126, but the line was discontinued.

Streets in Los Angeles County, California
Manhattan Beach, California
Boulevards in the United States